Saint-Pierre de Montrouge is a Roman Catholic parish church in the Petit-Montrouge quarter of the 14th arrondissement of Paris.

It was built from 1863, during Hausmann's redesign of the city, by Joseph Auguste Émile Vaudremer, the architect charged with designing the 14e arrondissement. It occupies a triangular site bounded by the Avenue du Maine and the avenue du général-Leclerc, and its bell-tower faces the quarter's central square. It is a listed monument since 1982.

External links
 Parish site

References

Pierre
Churches completed in 1863
19th-century Roman Catholic church buildings in France